Siege of Chittorgarh (23 October 1567 – 23 February 1568) was a part of military expedition of Mughal Empire under Akbar against the Mewar kingdom that began in 1567 in which the Mughals successfully captured the fort of Chittorgarh after a hard-pressed siege that lasted for several months.

Akbar, as part of his expansionist policy, besieged the politically important Sisodia capital of Chittor in October 1567 and gave a religious colour to the struggle by declaring it as a Jihād against the infidels. On Akbar's advance, Sisodia ruler Rana Udai Singh fled to the mountainous principality of his kingdom (on advice of his war councils) and placed the fort under the command of Jaimal Rathore.

After over four months of seesaw action in which the Mughal forces suffered heavy casualties, the battle eventually break the deadloack when Jaimal succumbed to a musket shoot of Akbar on 22 February 1568. The fort was captured the next morning on the day of Holi after a gallant resistance by the Rajputs. The sack of Chittor was proclaimed by Akbar as the victory of Islam over infidels.

After the subjugation of fort, Akbar ordered a general massacre of Chittor's population in which 30,000 Hindu civilians were slaughtered and several women and children were taken as prisoners. He handed the fort to his trusted general Asaf Khan and returned to Agra.

Background
In 1567, Akbar after putting down the revolts of Uzbeks turned his attention towards the Rajput states of Rajasthan. The Kachwaha ruler Bharmal already accepted his supremacy by sending his daughter Heer Kunwar into the Mughal Harem, although all other families except Amber were still hostile towards the Mughals. Thus, Akbar undertook vigorous expansionist policy to brought them under his sway. Due to the political importance of Chittor for a stable route to Malwa and Gujarat and for further inroads into the Deccan, Akbar advanced with a vast army and artillery from his capital Agra and besieged the fort on 23 October 1567. The contemporary Persian chronicles and his courtiers, also blamed Rana Udai Singh for providing refuge to the Afghan rebel Baz Bahadur as a reason of their invasion.

On hearing about Akbar's encroachment into his territory, Udai Singh along with the royal family on advice of his war councils and ministers fled to the western belt of Mewar in his newly established city of Udaipur. Some later writers accused him of cowardice and unworthy heir of Rana Sanga, although no contemporary Persian author gave such impression. Udai Singh placed the fort under the command of Jaimal Rathore with 8,000 cavalry and some musketeers.

When Akbar learnt of Udai Singh escape, he dispatched a force under Hussain Kuli Khan towards Udaipur to capture him, although he failed to capture the Rana and returned after plundering Udaipur and its surrounding districts. After the failure of Hussain Quli Khan, Akbar sent another contingent under Asaf Khan to capture Udai Singh. While he too failed to capture the Rana, though, he sacked the wealthy town of Rampura (renamed it to Islampur) which guard the southern flank of Chittor. According to Akbar, the Mughal troops returned with enormous spoils and "sent many worthless infidels to the abode of perdition".

Siege
Initially, the Mughals tried to attack the fortress directly but the citadel was so sturdy that the only options available to the Mughals were to either starve out the occupants of the fort or to somehow reach the walls and sap beneath them. After initial aggressive attempts at reaching the wall failed, Akbar ordered a complement of 5,000 expert builders, stonemasons, and carpenters to construct sabats (approach trenches) and mines to reach the walls. Two mines and one sabat were constructed after significant casualties while three batteries bombarded the fort. A large siege cannon was also cast to breach the walls once the sabat reached the objective.

Fifty-eight days after the siege began, the imperial sappers finally reached the walls of Chittorgarh. The two mines were exploded and the walls were breached at the cost of 200 of the assault force. But the defenders soon sealed the opening. Akbar then steadily brought his siege cannon closer to the walls under the cover of the sabat. Finally, on 22 February 1568, the Mughals were able to breach the walls at several locations simultaneously to begin a coordinated assault. While Jaimal was repairing the damage to the fort in night, Akbar killed Jaimal through a musket shot which shattered the morale of the defenders who considered the day lost.

On the night of 22 February 1568, several Rajput women at various places inside the fort committed Jauhar (self-immolation by fire) to protect their honour from the Mughals. Thus, on 23 February 1568 on the day of Hindu festival of Holi, the Rajputs dressed in saffron garments opened the gates for the last stand (Sakha) under the leadership of Fateh Singh Sisodia (Patta) and eventually by night, the fort was captured by the Mughals after a gallant resistance.

The siege also resulted in heavy casualties on the Mughal side, where two hundred of them were killed every day. The contemporaneous Persian accounts mentioned several instances during the siege where Akbar himself barely evaded death.

Aftermath
After capturing the fort on 23 February 1568, Akbar ordered a general massacre of Chittors population in which 30,000 Hindu civilians inside the fort who were largely non-combatants were slaughtered. After the mass slaughter, many women and children were enslaved followed by desecration of many Hindu and Jain temples on Akbar's order.

Akbar who earlier gave a religious colour to the conflict by declaring it as a Jihād, subsequently proclaimed the conquest of the fort as the victory of Islam over infidels. The Mughal soldiers who died in the combat were hailed as Ghazis by Akbar. He also issued a victory letter on 9 March 1568 where he addressed his governors of Punjab about the campaign (quoted by Andre Wink)

Akbar stayed at Chittorgarh for three days before leaving for the shrine of Moinuddin Chishti (bare footed), as part of his oath to visit the shrine after the conquest of Chittor. Akbar handed the charge of the fort to his trusted general Asaf Khan and returned to Agra.

On returning to Agra, Akbar erected the statues of Jaimal and Patta outside his fort either to honour their doughty resistance or to humiliate them as his doorkeepers. Akbar, also commented upon them in his victory letter. (translated by Ishtiyaq Ahmad Zilli)

The violent fate of Chittor turned to be a watershed in Akbar's conquest of north Indian plain and in his relations with the Rajput states. The reduction of Chittor, brought almost all of the leading Rajput kingdoms under his sway who were hostile towards him prior the battle. However, Udai Singh II, the Rana of Mewar, continued to remain at large until his death four years later. His son Maharana Pratap lost the Battle of Haldighati. Though losing the entire Mewar until 1582, through guerrilla warfare, he managed to regain western Mewar until his death. In 1615 Amar Singh I, the son of Pratap Singh, accepted Mughal suzerainty and a year later Jahangir, as a goodwill gesture, allowed him entry in Chittor Fort under the condition that it will never be repaired, as it might be used a bastion for future rebellions.

Traditions
The Jauhar of 1568 is a part of regional legend and is locally remembered on the Hindu festival of Holi (on the day Chittor was sacked) as a day of Chittorgarh massacre by Akbar, with "the red color signifying the blood that flowed on that day".

In popular culture
Mughal conquest of Chittor was part of Sony television series Bharat Ka Veer Putra – Maharana Pratap based on life of Maharana Pratap. The series depicted the besieging of fort in over twenty episodes tittled as Chittor par Sankat.

Footnotes

Citations

Bibliography

 
 
 
 
 
 
 
 
 

Chittorgarh
Chittorgarh
Chittorgarh
Chittorgarh
History of Rajasthan
1567 in India
1568 in India
Chittorgarh district
Conflicts in India
Chittorgarh Fort